Faces is an EP by American alternative rock band Residual Kid, which was released in October 2012.  It was produced by Chris "Frenchie" Smith.

Track listing

Personnel

Residual Kid
  Deven Ivy – vocals, guitar
  Ben Redman – drums
  Max Redman – bass guitar

Production
Produced by Chris "Frenchie" Smith
Recorded by Sean Rolie and mixed by Chris "Frenchie" Smith at The Bubble in Austin, Texas
Mastered by Jerry Tubb at Terra Nova Digital Audio, Inc. in Austin, Texas
Cody Schibi – artwork
Glen Brown – disc image

References

External links
 Official website
 Facebook Page

2012 EPs
Residual Kid albums
Albums produced by Chris "Frenchie" Smith